Ari is a given name in many languages and cultures, for both men and women. It also may be a nickname for a wide variety of unrelated names.

Etymology

Badaga 
Ari in the Badaga language, "Ari" ("A:ri") has a literal meaning of "sun-like" and is used as a male name, sometimes changed to "Harry" in the case of converts to Christianity.

Finnic languages
Ari is thought to be a Finnic form of Adrian.

Greek 
Ari or Aris is a common shortened version of the Greek names Aristotle, Ariadne, Ariana, Arietta, Aristides, Aristarchus, Aristomenes, Aristobulos, Aristoxenos, Aristos, Aristophanes, Aristea, Aristotelis, and others, the majority of which are compounds of the adjectival superlative áristos, "best" or "superior". They are also modern Greek transliterations for Ares, the god of war and the name for the planet Mars. The archaic Greek prefix ari- (e.g. in Ariadne, Arimnestus etc.) or eri-, a cognate of áristos, means "very" or "verily".

Hebrew

Ari is a common masculine given name in Hebrew (אריה/ארי). It means lion.

Scandinavian
Ari is a given name in Old Norse, Icelandic, Faroese, Danish, Norwegian and Swedish and means eagle or is the pet form of the names starting with Arn- or Old Norse ari "eagle".

People named Ari

 Ari Ahonen (born 1981), Finnish ice hockey goaltender
 Ari Angervo (born 1944), Finnish classical violinist and conductor
 Ari Anjala, Finnish orienteering competitor
 Ari Ankorin (1908–1986), Israeli politician and lawyer
 Ari Aster, American filmmaker and screenwriter
 Ari Babakhanov, Uzbek musician
 Ari Banias, American poet
 Ari Behn (1972–2019), Norwegian author and husband of Princess Märtha Louise of Norway
 Ari Ben-Menahem, seismologist, author, polymath, historian of science, professor
 Ari Ben-Menashe (born 1952), Iranian-born Israeli businessman, security consultant and author
 Ari Berk (born 1967), American writer
 Ari Berman (born 1970), American-Israeli rabbi, the fifth President of Yeshiva University
 Ari Borovoy (born 1979), Mexican musician
 Ari Boyland (born 1987), New Zealand actor
 Ari Bozão (born 1969), former Brazilian footballer
 Ari Brown (born 1944), American jazz musician
 Ari Brynjolfsson (1927–2013), Icelandic physicist
 Ari Clemente (born 1939), Brazilian former footballer
 Ari Cohen, Canadian actor
 Ari Djepaxhia (born 1991), Albanian footballer
 Ari Eldjárn (born 1981), Icelandic stand-up comedian, writer and actor
 Ari Elon (born 1950), Israeli writer, Bible scholar, and educator
 Ari Emanuel (born 1961), American talent agent
 Ari Fitz (born 1989), model, vlogger, television personality and film producer
 Ari Fleischer (born 1960), former White House Press Secretary for U.S. President George W. Bush
 Ari Folman (born 1962), Israeli film director, screenwriter and film score composer
 Ari Freyr Skúlason (born 1987), Icelandic footballer
 Ari Fuji (born 1968), pilot in command and flight instructor in Japan
 Ari Glass (born 1989), American painter, designer and musician
 Ari Gold (filmmaker), American filmmaker, actor, musician
 Ari Gold (musician) (born 1977), American R&B artist
 Ari L. Goldman (born 1949), American journalist and professor
 Ari Goldwag (born 1979), American Orthodox Jewish singer, songwriter, composer, author and teacher
 Ari Graynor (born 1983), American actress
 Ari Greenberg (born 1981), American contract bridge player
 Ari Gröndahl (born 1989), Finnish ice hockey defenceman
 Ari Guðmundsson (1927–2003), Icelandic swimmer and ski jumper
 Ari Trausti Guðmundsson (born 1948), Icelandic geologist, author, broadcaster, mountaineer and explorer
 Ari Haanpää (born 1965), Finnish ice hockey player
 Ari Handel, American neuroscientist, film producer and writer
 Ari Harow (born 1973), American-born Israeli political consultant
 Ari Heikkinen (born 1957), Finnish footballer
 Ari Helenius (born 1944), Finnish emeritus professor of biochemistry
 Ari Herstand (born 1985), American singer/songwriter
 Ari Hest (born 1979), American singer-songwriter
 Ari Hjelm (born 1962), Finnish football coach and former player
 Ari Hoenig (born 1973), American jazz drummer, composer and educator
 Ari Hoogenboom (1927–2014), American historian
 Ari Hoptman (born 1967), American actor and playwright
 Ari Huumonen (1956–2013), Finnish discus thrower
, Japanese long-distance runner
 Ari Jabotinsky (1910–1969), Revisionist Zionist activist, Israeli politician and academic
 Ari Joshua, American guitarist, songwriter, member of the band Big High
 Ari Jónsson (born 1994), Faroese footballer
 Ari Jósefsson (1939–1964), Icelandic poet
 Ari Kane, crossdresser, activist, educator, and a founder of the Fantasia Fair
 Ari Kattainen (born 1958), Finnish orienteering competitor
 Ari Kelman, American historian and professor
 Ari Koivunen (born 1984), Finnish heavy metal singer
 Ari Koponen (born 1982), Finnish politician and MP
 Ari Kurniawan (born 1978), Indonesian footballer
 Ari Lahti (born 1963), Finnish businessman, President of Football Association of Finland
 Ari Laptev (born 1950), Russian mathematician
 Ari Lasso (born 1973), Indonesian musician
 Ari Leff (born 1994), American singer and songwriter
 Ari Lehman (born 1965), American actor and performance artist
 Ari Leifsson (born 1998), Icelandic footballer
 Ari Lemmke (born 1963), Finnish computer programmer
 Ari Lennox (born 1991), American singer and songwriter
 Ari Lesser (born 1986), Jewish American rapper, singer, songwriter and spoken word artist
 Ari Libsker (born 1972), Israeli filmmaker and journalist
 Ari Lohenoja (born 1958), Finnish television producer and director
 Ari Louis (born 1983), Israeli-American talk show host
 Ari Luotonen, Finnish software developer and author
 Ari Magder (1983–2012), Canadian-born American actor
 Ari Mannio (born 1987), Finnish javelin thrower
 Ari Marcopoulos (born 1957), Dutch-American photographer and filmmaker
 Ari Marmell (born 1974) American novelist and game writer
 Ari Melber (born 1980), American journalist
 Ari Benjamin Meyers (born 1972), American artist and composer
 Ari Meyers (born 1969), American actress
 Ari Millen (born 1982), Canadian actor
 Ari Moisanen (born 1971), Finnish former professional ice hockey goaltender
 Ari Mustonen, Finnish cross-country skier
 Ari Ne'eman (born 1987), American autism rights activist
 Ari Norman, British designer of silver jewellery and gifts
 Ari Nyman (born 1984), Finnish footballer
 Ari Ólafsson (born 1998), Icelandic singer
 Aristotle Onassis (1906–1975), Greek shipping magnate and husband of Jacqueline Kennedy
 Ari Ozawa (born 1992), Japanese voice actress
 Ari Pakarinen (born 1969), Finnish javelin thrower
 Ari Palolahti (born 1968), Finnish cross-country skier
 Ari Paunonen (born 1958), Finnish runner
 Ari Peltonen, Finnish a cappella rock singer known as Paska
 Ari Porth (born 1970), American attorney, jurist, and politician
 Ari Poutiainen (born 1972), Finnish jazz musician and composer
 Ari Puheloinen (born 1951), Finnish general
 Ari Pulkkinen (born 1982), Finnish video game composer, musician, and sound designer
 Ari Rath (1925–2017), Austrian-Israeli journalist and writer
 Ari Renaldi, Indonesian composer, sound and mixing engineer, music director and musician
 Ari Rennert, American businessman, the president of Renco Group
 Ari Romero (1951–2013), Mexican professional wrestler
 Ari Rosenberg (born 1964), Israeli basketball player
 Ari Roth (born 1961), American theatrical producer, playwright, director, and educator
 Ari Saarinen (born 1967), Finnish ice hockey player
 Ari Salin (born 1947), Finnish hurdler and sprinter
 Ari Sandel (born 1974), American filmmaker
 Ari Santos (born 1982), Brazilian futsal player
 Ari Schwartz, American Internet Policy Advisor
 Ari Shaffir (born 1974), American stand-up comedian
 Ari Shapiro (born 1978), American radio journalist
 Ari Daniel Shapiro, American science journalist
 Ari Shavit (born 1957), Israeli reporter and writer
 Ari Singh II (1724–1773), Maharana of Mewar Kingdom
 Ari Sitas (born 1952), South African sociologist, writer, dramatist and civic activist
 Ari Freyr Skúlason (born 1987), Icelandic international footballer
 Ari Starace (born 1994), known as Y2K, American record producer and songwriter
 Ari Stidham (born 1992), American actor and musician
 Ari Suhonen (born 1965), Finnish middle-distance runner
 Ari Sulander (born 1969), Finnish ice hockey goaltender
 Ari Taub (director) (born 1965), American filmmaker
 Ari Taub (wrestler) (born 1971), Canadian Greco-Roman wrestler
 Ari Telch (born 1962), Mexican actor
 Ari Þorgilsson (1067–1148), Icelandic medieval chronicler
 Ari Tissari (born 1951), Finnish footballer
 Ari Torniainen (born 1956), Finnish politician and MP
 Ari Up (1962–2010), German-born singer
 Ari Väänänen (born 1947), Finnish long jumper
 Ari Vallin (born 1978), Finnish former professional ice hockey defenceman
 Ari Valvee (born 1960), Finnish footballer
 Ari Vatanen (born 1952), Finnish politician and former rally driver
 Ari Wallach (born 1974), Mexican-American businessman
 Ari Westergård (born 1948), Finnish former sports shooter
 Ari Westphal (born 1994), Brazilian fashion model
 Ari Wolfe (born 1971), American play-by-play announcer, reporter and anchor
 Ari Joshua Zucker, American guitarist and songwriter

Fictional characters
 Ari, the main protagonist of the mobile game Super Phantom Cat
 Ari Ben Canaan, protagonist in the novel Exodus by Leon Uris and the 1960 film adaptation, played by Paul Newman
 Ari Gold, on the comedy-drama television series Entourage
 Ari Haswari, an antagonist in NCIS
 Ari Tasarov, from the TV series Nikita
 Ari Tenenbaum, character in Wes Anderson's 2001 movie The Royal Tenenbaums
 Ari, one of two friends who often accompany Elinor in Elinor Wonders Why.

See also
 Ari, for other uses
 Arie, a Dutch and Hebrew masculine name
 Arieh (disambiguation)

Notes

Finnish masculine given names
Greek masculine given names
Hebrew masculine given names
Icelandic masculine given names
Jewish given names
Masculine given names
Uralic personal names